Inquest is a 1939 British crime film directed by Roy Boulting and starring Elizabeth Allan, Herbert Lomas, Hay Petrie and Barbara Everest. In the film, a young widow is accused of murder, and enlists the support of a King's Counsel to help prove her innocence. It was based on the play Inquest by Michael Barringer which had previously been adapted as Inquest in 1931. The film was a quota quickie made at Highbury Studios to be used as a supporting feature.

Cast
 Elizabeth Allan as Margaret Hamilton  
 Herbert Lomas as Thomas Knight  
 Hay Petrie as Stephen Neale  
 Barbara Everest as Mrs. Wyatt  
 Olive Sloane as Lily Prudence  
 Philip Friend as Richard Neale KC
 Harold Anstruther as Sir. Denton Hulme
 Malcolm Morley as Doctor Macfarlane

Critical reception
TV Guide concluded, "not bad as courtroom dramas go. This was the first attempt by the Boulting brothers to give higher production values to programmer filmmaking."

References

1939 films
1930s English-language films
British crime films
1939 crime films
British films based on plays
Films shot at Highbury Studios
Quota quickies
Films set in England
British black-and-white films
1930s British films